"It's Saturday" is a song by American rock band Marcy Playground, released as the first single from the band's second studio album, Shapeshifter (1999). It was originally titled "Teenage Hypochondriac" but was changed before the release date of the album. Although nowhere near as successful as the band's earlier smash hit "Sex and Candy," "It's Saturday" managed to hit number 25 on the US Modern Rock Charts. The lyrics of the song share common themes with the poem "Sick" by Shel Silverstein.

Track listing
 "It's Saturday" – 3:15

Chart positions

Music video
The music video for the song features the band members underneath the covers of a gigantic bed and reappearing in the beds of other sleepers. One scene shows them crawling into the bed of Pope John Paul II. It was directed by Peter Christopherson.

1999 singles
Marcy Playground songs
1999 songs
Capitol Records singles
Songs written by John Wozniak